In enzymology, an oxaloacetase is an enzyme that catalyzes the chemical reaction:

oxaloacetate + H2O  oxalate + acetate

Thus, the two substrates of this enzyme are oxaloacetate and H2O, whereas its two products are oxalate and acetate.

This enzyme belongs to the family of hydrolases, specifically those acting on carbon-carbon bonds in ketonic substances.  The systematic name of this enzyme class is oxaloacetate acetylhydrolase. This enzyme is also called oxalacetic hydrolase.

References

See also
 

EC 3.7.1
Enzymes of unknown structure